Wayne Lamb (born 19 October 1972) is a former Australian rules footballer who played with Melbourne and Fitzroy in the Australian Football League (AFL).

Lamb debuted for Melbourne in 1992  his first game was a draw verses Sydney . In either 1993 or 1994, Lamb played minimal games due to 2 knee operations. He made most of his AFL appearances in the 1995 season for Fitzroy, playing 16 games and receiving 2 Brownlow votes against Stkilda.

Lamb dislocated his elbow early 1996 and did not play again for the remainder of the season resulting in not be selected in the Brisbane/Fitzroy merger.

His son, Tom Lamb, was drafted to the  West Coast Eagles.

He moved to Tasmania in 1997 playing with New Norfolk and was later playing coach with the Cygnet Football Club 1998 , 1999 ,2000.

He has 3 other children Max , Madison and Matilda.

References

1972 births
Living people
Australian rules footballers from Victoria (Australia)
Melbourne Football Club players
Fitzroy Football Club players